Nastus is a genus of weevils in the Entiminae subfamily. It includes Nastus fausti Reitter.

References
http://www.zoology.unibe.ch/ecol/publ/PDF/Reznik%20et%20al%20%20Nastus%20Heracleum%202008.pdf

Entiminae
Curculionidae genera